Lydbury North is a civil parish in Shropshire, England.  It contains 57 listed buildings that are recorded in the National Heritage List for England.  Of these, one is listed at Grade I, the highest of the three grades, three are at Grade II*, the middle grade, and the others are at Grade II, the lowest grade.  The parish contains the villages of Lydbury North and Brockton, and smaller settlements including Plowden, but is otherwise rural.  Most of the listed buildings are houses and cottages, farmhouses and farm buildings, a high proportion of which are timber framed or have timber frame cores, and some contain cruck trusses.  The other listed buildings include a church, a tomb in the churchyard, country houses and associated structures, a public house, a former railway station and stationmaster's house, a water mill, and seven milestones.


Key

Buildings

References

Citations

Sources

Lists of buildings and structures in Shropshire